(6 May 1928 – 1990/1991) was a Japanese sprinter. He attended Konan University prior to his involvement in athletics. He later competed in the men's 4 × 400 metres relay at the 1952 Summer Olympics. Yamamoto died at the age of 62.

References

External links

1928 births
1990s deaths
Athletes (track and field) at the 1952 Summer Olympics
Japanese male sprinters
Olympic athletes of Japan
Place of birth missing
Konan University alumni